Graham Priest (born 1948) is Distinguished Professor of Philosophy at the CUNY Graduate Center, as well as a regular visitor at the University of Melbourne, where he was Boyce Gibson Professor of Philosophy and also  at the University of St Andrews.

Education
Priest was educated at St John's College, Cambridge and the London School of Economics. His thesis advisor was John Lane Bell. He also holds a DLitt from the University of Melbourne.

Philosophical work

He is known for his defence of dialetheism, his in-depth analyses of the logical paradoxes (holding the thesis that there is a uniform treatment for many well-known paradoxes, such as the semantic, set-theoretic and liar paradoxes), and his many writings related to paraconsistent and other non-classical logics. In these he draws on the history of philosophy, including Asian philosophy.

Priest, a long-time resident of Australia, now residing in New York City, is the author of numerous books, and has published articles in nearly every major philosophical and logical journal. He was a frequent collaborator with the late Richard Sylvan, a fellow proponent of dialetheism and paraconsistent logic.

Priest has also published on metaphilosophy (Beyond the Limits of Thought, 2002).

In addition to his work in philosophy and logic, Priest practiced Karate-do. He is 3rd Dan, International Karate-do Shobukai; 4th Dan, Shi’to Ryu, and an Australian National Kumite Referee and Kata Judge. Presently, he practices Taichi.

Books

References

External links
 Graham Priest personal website -- free pdfs of papers available for download
An in-depth autobiographical interview with Graham Priest
Priest archive on the CUNY Philosophy Commons
Video of Graham Priest & Maureen Eckert on Deviant Logic
 Rationally Speaking, Podcast of Graham Priest on Paradoxes and Paraconsistent Logic
 Arche Foundations of Logical Consequence Workshop 2009, "Is the Ternary R Depraved?"
The Monthly: Graham priest on Gottlob Frege 
The Philosopher's Zone, 10 July 2010: "It's All about Me: A Forum on the Philosophy of the Self"
The New York Times, The Stone Blog, 28 November 2010:  "Paradoxical Truth"
Graham Priest Photograph (full NYT version) Wikimedia Sept. 2010
Philosophy TV, 10 January 2011: Discussion of Deviant (Non-Classical) Logic, teaching logic, metafiction and logic with Maureen Eckert (UMASS Dartmouth)
Two-Part Interview on Florida Student Philosophy Blog: Part 1 General Questions and Part 2 Technical Questions.

1948 births
Living people
Writers from London
20th-century Australian philosophers
English philosophers
English logicians
Analytic philosophers
Metaphysicians
Academic staff of the University of Melbourne
Paraconsistent logic
Abstract object theory
Australian logicians
Alumni of St John's College, Cambridge
Alumni of the London School of Economics
Distinguished professors in the United States
Distinguished professors of philosophy